The 2011 Big Ten Conference Tournament was the postseason tournament of the Big Ten Conference to determine the Big Ten Conference’s champion and automatic berth into the 2011 NCAA Division I Men's Soccer Championship. The tournament was held at the University of Michigan in Ann Arbor, Michigan.

Bracket

Schedule

Quarterfinals

Semifinals

Final

Statistical Leaders

See also 
 Big Ten Conference Men's Soccer Tournament
 2011 Big Ten Conference men's soccer season
 2011 NCAA Division I Men's Soccer Championship
 2011 NCAA Division I men's soccer season

References 

Big Ten Men's Soccer Tournament
2011 Big Ten Conference men's soccer season

External links 
 Big Ten Men's Soccer Championship Central

Big Ten Men's Soccer Tournament
Big Ten Men's Soccer Tournament